Tjejer is the third studio album by Swedish dansband Arvingarna, released in 1994.

Track listing
"Tjejer"
"Under mitt täcke"
"Karneval i stan"
"Kärlekståg"
"Stanna här Sara"
"Ring om du vill nånting"
"När ett hjärta slår för någon"
"Det borde vara jag"
"Ny tjej i stan"
"Evelina"
"Det regnar i mitt hjjärta"
"Tänk på mig nångång ibland"
"Granna Anna"
"Räck mig din hand"

Charts

References

1994 albums
Arvingarna albums